The St. Louis Cardinals 2016 season was the 135th for the Major League Baseball (MLB) franchise in St. Louis, Missouri, the 125th season in the National League (NL), and the 11th at Busch Stadium III.  They entered the season having won a major-league best 100 games, as three-time defending NL Central division champions, and with five consecutive playoff appearances. Forbes magazine estimated the value of the club to be $1.6 billion in 2016, making it the seventh-most valuable franchise in MLB. The Cardinals were eliminated from playoff (Wild Card) contention following the San Francisco Giants' 7–1 victory over the Los Angeles Dodgers on Sunday, October 2. This was the first time the Cardinals failed to make the playoffs since 2010.

Off-season

Overview
The Cardinals entered the 2016 season having won a major league-best 100 games, their third consecutive National League Central division title, and fifth consecutive playoff appearance. Their 2015 season ended in the National League Division Series (NLDS) when the rival Chicago Cubs defeated them in four games. Former Cardinals David Eckstein, Jim Edmonds and Troy Glaus were announced as first-time candidates on the 2016 ballot for the National Baseball Hall of Fame and Museum on November 9. In mid-December, former Cardinals player and manager Joe Torre led an expedition to Cuba composed of MLB officials and players, including then-current Cardinals catcher Brayan Peña and former Cardinals outfielder Jon Jay.  It was MLB's first visit there since 1999, and one anticipated as an important step to help normalize relations with the United States that had begun to ease earlier in the year. Former Cardinals manager Vern Rapp died on December 31, 2015.

Chris Correa, the previous director of scouting for the Cardinals, plead guilty on January 8, 2016, to five of 12 counts in a United States district court in Houston related to alleged corporate espionage of the Houston Astros. Reports of the investigation first became public in July 2015. For the 2016 franchise Hall of Fame ballot, the Cardinals announced on January 17 it would include Chris Carpenter, Keith Hernandez, Jason Isringhausen, Mark McGwire, Matt Morris, Édgar Rentería, Scott Rolen, and Joe Torre.

According to Forbes magazine, at $1.6 billion, the Cardinals were the seventh-most valuable franchise in MLB.  Their revenue in 2015 was $300 million, while their operating income was $60 million. It was an increase from the year before at $1.4 billion, when they were ranked sixth in MLB.

Personnel moves
On October 26, 2015, the club announced intent to retain all of manager Mike Matheny's coaching staff. Greg Hauch resigned as the head athletic trainer in November, whom Adam Olsen replaced the following month.

Injuries
Injuries to the starting rotation emerged: Carlos Martínez strained his shoulder late in the previous season and the Cardinals appraised him likely to recover in time for the beginning of the season. Lance Lynn had Tommy John surgery, and on November 10, the Cardinals announced he would miss the 2016 season. On December 17, catcher Yadier Molina underwent surgery on his left thumb, and second since the previous September, to correct a ligament that had not properly healed.  He was estimated to miss at least part of spring training.

Acquisitions, departures, and roster moves

Players

Spring training
The Cardinals announced on January 21, 2016, they had extended an invitation to spring training to 22 non-roster players in addition to those already on the 40-man roster, bringing the total at that point to start spring training with club 61.  Further, 26 of their prospects were also invited to their Spring training Early Program (STEP).  The 22 non-roster invitees included pitchers RHP Silfredo Garcia, LHP Austin Gomber, RHP Juan González, RHP Jeremy Hefner, LHP Corey Littrell, RHP Deck McGuire, RHP Trey Nielsen, RHP Daniel Poncedeleon, RHP Robby Rowland, RHP J. C. Sulbaran, RHP Tyler Waldron, and RHP Luke Weaver.  Non-pitchers included catchers Steve Bean, Luis Cruz, Eric Fryer, Carson Kelly, and Alberto Rosario.  Also included were infielders Jonathan Rodriguez, David Washington, Jacob Wilson and Patrick Wisdom and outfielder Jeremy Hazelbaker. The next day, the club invited outfielder Carlos Peguero.

The 26 players invited to STEP were Sandy Alcantara, John Brebbia, Junior Fernandez, Jack Flaherty, Derian Gonzalez, Josh Lucas, Mike Mayers, Alex Reyes, Arturo Reyes, Rowan Wick and Jacob Woodford; catchers Christopher Chinea, Jose Godoy, Ryan McCarvel and Brian O’Keefe; infielders Eliezer Alvarez, Paul DeJong, Juan Herrera, Chris Jacobs, Oscar Mercado, Darren Seferina and Edmundo Sosa; and outfielders Harrison Bader, C. J. McElroy, Nick Plummer and Magneuris Sierra.

Shortstop Jhonny Peralta injured his thumb on March 7, damaging the ulnar collateral ligament. He underwent surgery three days later and was expected to miss 10 to 12 weeks of play.

Longtime 3B coach Jose Oquendo for the past 16 years, is placed on medical leave of absence March 27, due to rehabbing his right knee in Florida. He has been on crutches after his second procedure on the knee. 1B coach Chris Maloney now moves to 3B, Assistant hitting coach Bill Mueller moves to 1B coach. Derrick May who was in the organization's minor leagues, is now the assistant hitting coach.

The team suffered another unexpected injury in their final spring training game on March 31, when their newly acquired shortstop Ruben Tejada signed on March 19, strained his left quad running to first base in a 9–1 win over the New York Yankees. Jedd Gyorko will substitute for him and make the first game start in Pittsburgh on April 3. The injury to Tejada forces the Cardinals to open the season with five players: Tejada, Jhonny Peralta, Mitch Harris, Lance Lynn and Jordan Walden, on the 15-day disabled list.

Another serious injury, this one to backup catcher Brayan Pena's left knee after slipping in a dugout a few days ago, puts him on the 15-day disabled list after surgery from two to four weeks, along with the five others. Non-Roster Invite Eric Fryer takes his place on the 25-man roster.

Season standings

National League Central

National League playoff standings

National League head-to-head records

Record vs. Opponents

Regular season summary

April

Opening Series vs. Pittsburgh Pirates
The Cardinals played Opening Day in the first game of the Major League Baseball (MLB) season on April 3, commencing at PNC Park against the division rival Pittsburgh Pirates.  Adam Wainwright made his fifth career Opening Day start for the Cardinals.  The game had a starting temperature of 39 degrees (F).  Outfielder Tommy Pham suffered a tear in his left oblique in the first inning and placed on the 15-day disabled list (DL). The Cardinals lost the game, 4–1, with Wainwright taking the first loss of the season.  Free agent starting pitcher acquisition Mike Leake made his Cardinals debut on April 6 against the Pirates, allowing four runs and seven hits in  IP, resulting in being charged with the loss as Pittsburgh won, 5–1, and swept the opening series.

Molina breaks Cardinals' games caught record
Yadier Molina, 33, broke the all-time Cardinals' games catching record on April 8, in his 1,440th game, passing Ted Simmons (1968–1980). His 1,343 games started since the beginning of the 2005 season topped the majors.

Hazelbaker, Díaz, and Garcia establish MLB pinch-hitting home run record

On April 8, Jeremy Hazelbaker, Aledmys Díaz, and Greg Garcia established a new MLB record by each hitting a pinch hit home run, becoming the first to hit three pinch hit home runs in one game for the same team.  The previous record of two pinch hit home runs by the same team in the same game had previously occurred on 57 occasions, most recently in 2011.  It was Díaz' first major league home run.  The Cardinals won this contest, 7–4, over the Atlanta Braves. Hazelbaker's home run gave him two in his first four career games, joining Joe Cunningham (1954) as the only Cardinals to accomplish the feat. The Cardinals swept the Braves on April 10 in a 12–6 win.  Brandon Moss hit his first career home run against Atlanta off Williams Pérez, thus giving him a home run against all 30 teams. Seung-hwan Oh was credited with his first major league win. Hazelbaker's first career four-hit game, including his first career triple, came in a 10–1 victory over the Milwaukee Brewers in the Cardinals' April 11 home opener at Busch Stadium.

García throws one-hitter
In his second appearance of the season, starter Jaime García turned in a career start against the Milwaukee Brewers on April 14. He pitched a complete game, one-hit shutout while striking out a career-high 13 batters and inducing 13 ground outs as St. Louis won, 7–0. He became the first left-handed pitcher in franchise history to achieve a one-hit shutout while striking out at least 13. The 13 strikeouts were the most by a lefty since Steve Carlton struck out 16 in 1970, with García posting a game score of 97, a season-high for MLB through April 14.  The Cardinals did not have a nine-inning complete game by a starter all of last season. It was the first one-hitter by a Cardinals' pitcher since Wainwright held the Arizona Diamondbacks to one hit on May 20, 2014. In this game, Brandon Moss and Matt Adams both contributed pinch hit home runs.

Cardinals break record at Busch III with six home runs
The club was smoking hot at the plate on April 15, with a new Busch III record of six home runs in a 14–3 thrashing of Cincinnati. Matt Holliday hit his first two home runs of the season, Aledmys Díaz and Randal Grichuk both also hit their second on the year, and Brandon Moss and Matt Adams homered off the bench.  Moss' and Adams' home runs were the fifth and sixth off the bench in 2016. The club had only four in the entire 2015 season.  The six home runs gave the team 17 in its first 10 games. They had only 137 in 2015 which ranked 25th out of the 30 teams. Cardinals pinch hitters are hitting .563 (9-for-16) with six homers and nine RBIs. The team record of 10 pinch hit home runs was set in 1998. Joey Votto hit his first home run of the season, tying the single-game mark for two teams at Busch III with seven, done by these same teams one day before the 10th anniversary in doing it on April 16, 2006.

Fryer's continued perfect start and game-winning RBI
Catcher Eric Fryer made his first start for the Cardinals on April 17 at Busch Stadium against the Reds.  He reached base in all four plate appearances, including three hits in three at bats and first walk of the season, to extend a streak of seven consecutive plate appearances reaching base to open the season.  His collected his first two doubles for the Cardinals, including driving in Aledmys Díaz for the decisive run in a 4–3 win, allowing St. Louis to take two of three in the series from Cincinnati.

Greg Garcia optioned
The Cardinals optioned Greg Garcia to their AAA-Memphis club on April 18, when they reactivated Rubén Tejada. Garcia had six hits in ten at bats for a .600 batting average, six runs scored, one double, one home run, two RBIs, four walks, a HBP, a .733 OBP, and a 1.000 SLG in 15 plate appearances.

Trevor Rosenthal records 100th career save
Trevor Rosenthal recorded his 100th career save by striking out the side against the Chicago Cubs on April 20, becoming the fifth Cardinals pitcher to accumulate 100 saves. In an 11–2 win over the San Diego Padres on April 23, Díaz garnered his first five-hit game and Hazelbaker hit another pinch hit home run.

Almedys Diaz is first rookie to have .500 batting average after 50 ABs
After collecting two hits in his first two at bats in a game against the Arizona Diamondbacks on April 25 to give him 26 hits in 52 at bats, Díaz became the first rookie in MLB history to carry at least a .500 batting average at any point after accumulating 50 at bats, per the Elias Sports Bureau. On April 29, the club announced that former owner Sam Breadon, starting pitcher Chris Carpenter, center fielder Terry Moore, and catcher and manager Joe Torre were selected as the 2016 class to be inducted into the franchise Hall of Fame, with the enshrinement scheduled for August 27, 2016.

Cardinals below .500 at home
The team ended April with a three-game losing streak at home to the Nationals, falling to 5–6 at home, 7–6 on the road, for a .500 record (12–12) for the month.

May

The Cardinals, through the first month of 2016 having improved their run-scoring and home run rates from the previous season, likewise received increased hitting contribution from Wainwright.  He hit his first home run of season in a 10–3 win over the Philadelphia Phillies on May 2, also being credited with his second win of the season. In each of four consecutive plate appearances spanning April 27 to May 7, he became the first Cardinal pitcher since 1900 to garner an extra base hit while batting, per the Elias Sports Bureau. Carpenter's first career walk-off home run came on May 7 in a 6–4 win over Pittsburgh.

Mike Leake, the club's top free agent acquisition in terms of amount of money awarded from the previous off-season, earned his first win a Cardinals uniform on May 10 against the Los Angeles Angels of Anaheim in an 8–1 advantage.

Maness on DL
Reliever Seth Maness landed on the DL for the first time in his career on May 14 (retroactive to May 13), after an exam revealed an inflammation on his right (pitching) elbow. He was having pitching difficulties, getting hit hard in his previous  inning against the Anaheim Angels on May 12. For the season, he has a 6.39 ERA and 1.97 WHIP in  innings. The velocity on all four of his pitches has been down an average of 2–3 mph this season. He will eventually be able to join a Minor League affiliate on a rehab assignment, instead of as a member of that club's roster. That rehab assignment can last up to 30 days.

To take Maness' place on the MLB roster, the club called up left-handed reliever Dean Kiekhefer from Memphis. He made his major league debut on May 14 in Los Angeles in the sixth inning against the Dodgers, striking out four and allowing no walks in  innings. The only hit and run charged to him—both firsts of his career—was a home run to Corey Seager.

Molina makes 1,500th career appearance
Molina made the 1,500th career appearance overall of his major league career in the May 14 game against Los Angeles.

Carpenter ties Cardinals' leadoff record with 6 RBI
On May 19, Matt Carpenter established a new career-high six RBI in a game at Busch Stadium against the Colorado Rockies, with two doubles and his ninth HR of the season in a 13–7 win. Carpenter is the first Cardinal since Red Schoendienst in 1953 to record two doubles, a home run and six RBI in a single game, and the first Cardinals leadoff hitter since Shawon Dunston in 2000 to have six RBI in a single game.  His batting average went up 13 points to .259, far below his .313 he was hitting after 41 games in 2015. Reliever Jonathan Broxton started the season with a 2.25 ERA through May 19, but after allowing five earned runs while recording one out against the Arizona Diamondbacks on May 20 at Busch Stadium, his ERA jumped to 4.96, and the Diamondbacks held a 9–2 advantage. As a result, backup infielder Rubén Tejada made his first major league appearance as a pitcher in the ninth inning, pitching one complete inning while allowing two earned runs on back-to-back home runs to Chris Herrmann and Brandon Drury.

Alex Reyes returns from 50-game suspension
The Cardinals No. 1 pitching prospect and No. 11 in all of MLB, Alex Reyes, returned from his 50-game suspension, pitching four scoreless innings on May 22, for AAA Memphis. He gave up two singles, walked three, and struck out eight. He tested positive for marijuana, and Major League Baseball suspended Reyes on November 9, 2015, for 50 games including the remainder of his Arizona Fall League play, and start of the 2016 season.

Randal Grichuk gets his first walk-off HR
Center fielder Randal Grichuk hit his first career walk-off home run on May 23 in a 4–3 win against the Cubs.

Mitch Harris to 60-day DL; Cards buy José Martínez from KC Royals
Reliever Mitch Harris is transferred to the 60-day DL, and the team bought LF José Martínez from the Kansas City Royals for cash.

Matt Carpenter on Paternity Leave, Greg Garcia recalled
Third Baseman Matt Carpenter was granted paternity leave to attend the birth of his first child on May 25, causing him to miss the rubber game against the Chicago Cubs. The team can replace him on the roster for up to three days before going with only 24 active players. The Cardinals recalled Greg Garcia from AAA Memphis to take Carpenter's place on the active roster. After missing three games (May 25–27), Carpenter returned and Greg Garcia was also kept on the roster, hitting a torrid .615 for the season. Rubén Tejada was designated for assignment for the move to make room for Carpenter and to keep Garcia. Tejada had signed a one-year $1.5 mil. contract, but only hit .176 (6-for-34) with two doubles. Tejada can now choose to accept the Cardinals' assignment to Triple-A, or sign with another team.

Stephen Piscotty's first career Grand Slam, Mike Matheny's 400th win and Holliday's 1,000th hit with Cardinals
While playing the Nationals in the seventh inning of a 2–1 loss at Busch Stadium on May 26, Stephen Drew hit a high infield fly that stayed over the pitcher's mound.  With both Aledmys Díaz and Mike Leake attempting to catch the ball, Molina posited himself and waited.  As the ball deflected off Díaz' glove, he almost collided with Leake, but Molina instinctively moved his glove and caught the ball before it hit the ground. The Cardinals defeated the Nationals the next day, 6–2, as Stephen Piscotty hit his first career grand slam against Max Scherzer, Garcia homered and drew two walks batting leadoff and Mike Matheny achieved his 400th career managerial win. He managed his 700th game on May 30, a 6–0 win against the Milwaukee Brewers.  Matt Holliday collected his 1,000th career hit with the Cardinals on May 31 against the Brewers.

June

Brandon Moss ties franchise pinch-hit home run record
In a 3–1 loss to the Brewers on June 1, Brandon Moss' 10th home run, a pinch-hit, accounted for the only Cardinals' run of the game. In the 54th game of 2016, this tied the franchise club record for pinch-hit home runs in a season with 10, set in 1998. The Major League record is 14, set in 2001, by both the Arizona Diamondbacks and San Francisco Giants. In 2001, the Diamondbacks were World Series champions, while the Cardinals and Giants in those respective years, hosted Mark McGwire and Barry Bonds both breaking the individual single-season home run record. The 2016 Cardinals, with 72 home runs at the one-third mark as a team, were 32 ahead of the year before. Through this point, Moss and Hazelbaker both led the 2016 team with three pinch-hit home runs.

Díaz and Oh among early frontrunners for NL Rookie of the Year Award
Both Aledmys Díaz and Seung-Hwan Oh garnered early attention for the National League (NL) Rookie of the Year Award.  As of June 6, Díaz was third in the NL in batting at .328 and had hit eight home runs and 30 RBIs. Oh, in his first 31 games and  innings pitched, had struck out 46 batters – tied for first among NL relievers – while walking eight and permitting an ERA of 1.65.

Kolten Wong optioned to AAA
On June 6, 2B Kolten Wong was optioned to AAA-Memphis, in anticipation of Jhonny Peralta's activation from the disabled list.

Matt Carpenter wins NL Player of the Week Award
On June 6, Matt Carpenter won the NL Major League Baseball Player of the Week Award for the May 30 – June 5-week. He batted .560 (14-for-25), with five doubles, two triples, three RBI, and 10 runs scored. He led all of MLB with a .577 OBP and his 10 runs. He slugged .920 for a 1.497 OPS.  This was his second career weekly award, having won previously for the week of April 13–19, 2015. He won it less than two weeks after the birth of his first child, daughter Kinley on May 25.

Wong recalled, Jeremy Hazelbaker optioned
On June 17, Kolten Wong was recalled, while OF'er Jeremy Hazelbaker was optioned to AAA-Memphis. Wong played some of his seven games in centerfield, while hitting .429 (12-for-28), with 4 HR and 11 RBI. He hit safely in all seven games. Hazelbaker hit .250 in his 61 G with 7 HR, 3 of them as a pinch-hitter. He led the team with 4 SB.

Randal Grichuk optioned, Tommy Pham recalled
The day after Wong was recalled, OF'er Tommy Pham was recalled from AAA-Memphis on June 18, and struggling OF'er Randal Grichuk was optioned. Grichuk hit only .206 with 8 HR, and 27 RBI in 62 G.

Seth Maness activated, Dean Kiekhefer optioned
For the third consecutive day (June 19), the Cardinals recalled (activated) a player, and optioned another. RHP reliever Seth Maness was activated, and Dean Kiekhefer was optioned to AAA-Memphis.

Rosenthal removed as 'Closer'
On June 25, manager Mike Matheny told closer Trevor Rosenthal he would be used in a different role. The move will bump Rosenthal out of a closer's job that has been his since late in 2013. He had a frightful 14.14 ERA in June and 5.63 for the season, and blew a save opportunity on June 24, when he gave up in succession a double, a walk, and then a game-winning three-run home run when leading 3–1 against the Seattle Mariners. He averaged 7.9 walks per 9 inn. His percentage of first-pitch strikes was only 61%. Matheny has not named a replacement closer, but said he will instead consider Seung Hwan Oh, Kevin Siegrist, and Jonathan Broxton as options for future save situations. Oh compiled 357 career saves pitching in Korea and Japan, and currently ranks among the top eight National League relievers in ERA (1.66), strikeouts (51), Holds (14) and WHIP (0.79). Broxton was an All-Star closer for the Dodgers in 2009 and 2010. He has compiled 118 career saves, though none since 2014. Siegrist is the only Cardinals reliever besides Rosenthal to close a game (May 12) this season. He has tallied seven career saves and entered Saturday with a season ERA of 2.79.

Cardinals tie franchise record with 13 extra-base hits
The Cardinals tied a franchise record, not seen since 1940, with 13 extra-base hits (6 home runs, 5 doubles, 2 triples) in an 11–6 win against the Seattle Mariners, at Safeco Field on June 26. The six home runs, second time in a game this season (April 15), boosted the team total to 101. They had 137 in all of 2015, and 105 in 2014. Matt Carpenter tripled, and hit two home runs in the barrage of 17 hits. Tommy Pham also hit two home runs. Jedd Gyorko hit one, as did Matt Holliday, the 150th for him as a Cardinals' player. All six home runs were solo blasts and all came in the sixth-ninth innings. The six home runs were one short of the seven for the franchise record, set in 1996, and 1913.

Brayan Pena activated, Eric Fryer DFA
Backup catcher Brayan Pena was activated prior to the game on June 28, after missing 75 games on the DL. Eric Fryer was designated for assignment. These moves drop the 40-man roster personnel to 38.

Cardinals worst in NL Base-running
Through the games on June 28, the Cardinals are the worst base-running team in the NL. The stat is called BsR, explained on the stat site Fangraphs as an all-encompassing base running statistic that considers "stolen bases, caught stealings, and other base running plays (taking extra bases, being thrown out on the bases, etc)." A BsR number of six is "great," while zero is "average" and negative-six is "awful." The Padres actually lead the NL with an astounding 12.2 BsR, while the Cubs are at 9.7. The Cards are minus-9.7. In 2015, the Cards finished 15th in baseball with a 0.7 BsR, essentially right at the league average.

Cardinals below .400 at Home
The Cardinals ended June with a 15–23 (.395) home record. The team won 50-plus home games in each of Mike Matheny's first four seasons, has now lost seven consecutive home games. They are 25–15 (.625) in away games, trailing only the Cubs and Giants. The Cardinals haven't finished a season with a losing home record since 1999. That team finished 75–86 overall.

Brandon Moss hit the longest home run in Busch Stadium history in a 4–2 loss to Kansas City on June 30, which traveled , and to that point, was the second-longest home run of the season in the major leagues.

July

Kevin Siegrist on DL
Newly appointed part-time closer Kevin Siegrist had his season interrupted with a bout of mononucleosis.  He was placed on the DL July 1, retroactive to June 30. Sam Tuivailala was recalled.

Yadier Molina gets 1,500th Hit; Seung Hwan Oh his first save
Playing Milwaukee on July 2, Yadier Molina recorded his 1,500th career hit, becoming the 34th catcher in MLB history, and second for the Cardinals, after Ted Simmons. Oh recorded his first MLB save by pitching a perfect ninth with two strikeouts.

Cardinals 43–38 after First One-Half
After the 9–8 win on July 3, the club is 43–38 at the end of the first half of the season. Their third consecutive Home win raises it to 18–23 (.439). Away, they are 25–15 (.625). In 2015, the club was 55–26 (.679) at Home, 45–36 (.556) Away.

Brandon Moss on DL, Randal Grichuk recalled
On July 5, Infielder/Outfielder Brandon Moss was placed on the DL because of a sprained left ankle. Randal Grichuk was recalled.

Matt Carpenter named to NL All-Star team
On July 5, Matt Carpenter was named as a reserve (3B) to the NL All-Star team in San Diego, July 12.

Brayan Pena back on DL, Alberto Rosario purchased
Brayan Pena was back on the DL on July 6, with a left knee inflammation, after making only two starts after activated on June 28. He started July 5's game and went 0-for-3 and allowed a passed ball, a wild pitch and two stolen bases. The club purchased Alberto Rosario from AAA-Memphis.

Sweeps for the Cards don't mean much
The Cardinals had swept 4 teams this season coming into July. In the 2 series following each sweep, they are 9–15. After the sweep of the Brewers in the beginning of July, they lost 3 of 4 to the Pirates, winning the last game to make that record 10–18. They then went to Milwaukee, losing the 1st game, but came back to win the final 2. Now 12–19 after sweeping an opponent.

Matt Carpenter on DL, will miss All-Star Game
Matt Carpenter strained his right oblique muscle swinging at a pitch against the Pirates on July 6, and won't be able to play in the July 12 All-Star Game. Aledmys Diaz will replace him on that roster. Entering Thursday (July 7), Diaz's .319 average led NL shortstops. He ranked second with a .534 slugging percentage, and 54 runs scored. He is the first Cardinals' rookie since Albert Pujols to make the All-Star team. Carpenter is the fourth player to go on the DL in the last week. As a leadoff hitter, Carpenter entered the day leading the NL with a .421 on-base percentage, and a .991 OPS. He also ranks among the league's top six in doubles (25), extra-base hits (44), walks (58), triples (5), runs (56), and slugging percentage (.570).

Siegrist activated, Tuivailala optioned
Before the first game after the All-Star Game break, on July 15, LH reliever Kevin Siegrist was activated from the DL, after missing 10 games. Sam Tuivailala was optioned to AAA.

Wainwright pitches 3-hit shutout
Adam Wainwright pitched a three-hit, complete-game shutout and 5–0 win against Miami on July 15; the first hit he allowed was a double to Adeiny Hechavarria in the sixth inning. It was Wainwright's 10th career shutout, and 22nd complete game, coming on the night of celebrating the 10th anniversary and tribute to the 2006 World Series championship team. Wainwright was a reliever, and threw the final, winning pitch in that World Series. It was the sixth shutout by the team in 2016, against four times being shutout. The Marlins, who have four players in the lineup batting higher than .300, were shut out for just the fourth time this year.

Cardinals sweep Padres and their former infielder Gyorko contributes big
In the consecutive starts against the Milwaukee Brewers and San Diego Padres on July 10 and 18, Mike Leake struck out at least ten batters in consecutive games for the first time in his career, after previously having two total ten-strikeout games in 189 starts. Covering his previous  innings, he had struck out 45 batters while walking three.

In the first three games of the July 18–21 series against the Padres, Jedd Gyorko homered in each game.  That included a streak of five consecutive games against San Diego with a home run, totaling six.  He also had 13 hits in 21 at bats with 10 RBI.  He had hit the go-ahead home run in both of the first two games of the series, including driving in all three in the 3–2 win in the second game. By saving both games of a doubleheader on July 20, Seung-hwan Oh was the first Cardinals pitcher to do so since Jason Isringhausen in 2004. On July 21, with a 5–5 tie in the bottom of the ninth, Aledmys Díaz batted against Carlos Villanueva with the bases loaded and singled home the game-winning run for his first career walk-off hit.

Matt Adams wins 16-inn. game
On July 22, while playing the Los Angeles Dodgers, Matt Adams hit a  home run in the 16th inning for walk-off, 4–3, win. It was the second time in his career he had hit a walk-off home run in the 16th inning.

Mike Mayers to make debut July 24
The Cardinals announced on July 23 that they had selected the contract of right-hand pitcher Mike Mayers to major his major league debut and start the following day against the Dodgers, a Sunday nationally televised game on ESPN at Busch Stadium. Reliever Miguel Socolovich was optioned to AAA-Memphis. The club will be the last team in the Majors to employ a sixth starting pitcher this season when Mayers takes the mound. The need to find a fill-in starter was the result of the Cardinals having to play a doubleheader on July 20, and then a 16-inn. game on July 22. He was destroyed by the Dodgers, giving up 9 runs, all earned, 8 hits (one Double, two HRs), walking two, striking out only one in just 1.1 IP. He endured the shortest start by a pitcher making his Major League debut in 12 years, and the first Cardinals pitcher in 92 years to allow six first-inning runs in his debut. His early exit meant that a bullpen two days removed from covering 10 innings had to shoulder another 7 2/3. Seth Maness threw a career-high 53 pitches over 3 2/3 innings to settle things.

Cardinals option Mayers, purchase Jerome Williams, Walden to 60-day DL
After the Mayers' debacle the previous night, on July 25, the Cardinals optioned him back to AAA, and purchased the contract of RHP Jerome Williams, 34. To make room for him on the 40-man roster, Jordan Walden was transferred from the 15-day to the 60-day disabled list.

Rosenthal on DL, Kiekhefer recalled
RHP Reliever Trevor Rosenthal was placed on the 15-day disabled list July 26, from a right shoulder inflammation in his rotator cuff. LHP Dean Kiekhefer was recalled from AAA. RHP Sam Tuivailala will be recalled after the opener of that day's double-header to serve as the 26th man.

Cardinals win in 9th vs. NY Mets, end Familia's save streak
The Cardinals won the scintillating back-and-forth rubber game 5–4 on July 27, in New York with a two-run ninth-inning rally, pushing them past that team in the Wild Card standings. Yadier Molina tied the game 4–4 with a one-out double to centerfield in the top of the ninth, and later, a two-out pinch-hit double by Kolten Wong gave them the deciding fifth run. It was the first blown save by Mets' closer Jeurys Familia, who had 36 for the season going into the ninth inning, since July 30, 2015. He had 52 consecutive saves in that span of 363 days (excluding the 2015 playoffs), the third longest streak in history.

Cardinals have best Road record in MLB, move into second Wild Card spot
With their 11–6 win in Miami July 29, the Cardinals have a 31–17 (.646) Road record, best in baseball. Their Home record is 25–30 (.455), for a 56–47 record, nine-games-over .500 high point for the season. They also moved past the Marlins into the second Wild Card spot, behind the Dodgers, who have a two-game lead. The game marked the 10th time this season that the Cardinals have scored 11 or more runs in a game. From 2014 to 2015, the club reached that level of offensive output only five times. The burst of scoring snapped a streak of six consecutive one-run wins by the club.

Cardinals trade OF Charlie Tilson to Chicago White Sox for LHP Zach Duke
On the day before the non-waiver trade deadline this year (Mon. Aug. 1, 3pm), the Cardinals traded outfielder Charlie Tilson for LHP reliever Zach Duke, 33. Duke led the AL with 53 appearances mostly in a setup role which is how the Cardinals plan to use him, posting 2–0, 2.63 ERA and 1.25 WHIP over  innings. Duke is under contract in 2017, earning $5 mil. this year and $5.5 mil. next year. LH batters hit .264 against him compared to .182 for righties, a backwards split contrasting with the usual split for pitchers. But RH batters have walked 13 times, giving them a .325 OBP against Duke, compared to him walking LH batters only 3 times for a .299 OBP.

Home 25–30, Away 31–19
At the end of July, the Cardinals HOME record was 25–30 (.455), AWAY record 31–19 (.620).

August

Aledmys Diaz to DL
All-Star shortstop Aledmys Diaz (26 on August 1), will go on the DL August 2, with a hairline fracture in his right thumb. He was hit by a pitch on July 31, from Marlins' starter Andrew Cashner. He was expected to miss several weeks. Jhonny Peralta will take over at shortstop when he comes off the DL, August 2. Diaz was hitting .312/.376/.518 with 14 home runs and 57 RBIs. He was the only Cardinals' player to appear in last month's All-Star Game.

Brandon Moss and Jhonny Peralta activated from DL, Zach Duke added
Brandon Moss (missed 25 G), and Jhonny Peralta (missed 15 G) were activated from the DL on August 2. Recent trade LH-reliever Zach Duke was added to the roster. To make room, OF Randal Grichuk and LH-reliever Dean Kiekhefer were optioned to AAA Memphis.

Tyler Lyons on DL
The rash of debilitating injuries continued on August 2, when it was determined after the game that LH-reliever Tyler Lyons had a stress reaction on his sore right knee, and would be placed on the DL, August 3. He had undergone treatment, but a scan revealed it was more than just discomfort. The move to the DL was retroactive to July 31, and Dean Kiekhefer was recalled from Memphis.

Carpenter activated from DL, Kiekhefer optioned
Infielder Matt Carpenter was activated on August 5, after missing 24 games from his in-game July 6 injury. LH-reliever Dean Kiekhefer was optioned to AAA-Memphis.

Cardinals lose series to worst team in baseball
The Cardinals before the August 5 game (57–51 .528) lost two of three games to the worst team—with the fewest runs scored in baseball, the Atlanta Braves, (39–69 .361), thanks to the final two games. The relief pitchers in the ninth inning of game two (5–13) were blasted for six runs, and starter-ace Adam Wainwright was hit hard for six runs in the first two innings in game three (3–6), although kept in the game through six innings giving up nine hits in total, but no more runs. Carlos Martinez now 10–7, and Wainwright now 9–6, took the losses. The team has now lost consecutive series, six of eight games, against last-place clubs (Cincinnati Reds and Braves). The team dropped to  game behind the Miami Marlins for the final Wild Card spot.

Wildest and largest 9th inning comeback win all season
In the wildest and largest ninth-inning comeback win all season, the Cardinals at home on August 8, scored all five of their runs in the bottom of the ninth after two outs, for a 5–4 win. Previously, the team was an awful 2–45 when trailing after eight innings. The team fell into a 0–4 hole, and were 0-for-11 with runners in scoring position. It was the 10th time in the last 15 games that a starter could not get to the sixth inning. Down to his last strike at 1–2, Brandon Moss got the tying run in with a bases-loaded walk, and Yadier Molina then finished off the improbable comeback win by getting hit in the ribs by a pitch. The Cardinals have won three of the last four Major League games to end on a walk-off hit-by-pitch. It happened most recently for St. Louis on Aug. 14, 2014, when Jon Jay took a pitch off his body. That was also against the Reds. With the win, the team got its 59th win against 53 losses, tying the Miami Marlins for the second Wild Card spot with 50 games remaining in the season. Michael Wacha could go only five innings, as the fifth starter in a week to not get to the sixth inning.

Michael Wacha on DL, Alex Reyes purchased, Pena to 60-day DL
RHP Michael Wacha was placed on the DL with right shoulder inflammation on August 9, the day after his five-inning start. Backup catcher Brayan Pena was transferred to the 60-day DL, to make room for the Cardinals purchasing their long-awaited, ninth-best prospect in baseball, RHP Alex Reyes from AAA-Memphis, and added him to the roster. He made his debut that evening (20 days before his 22nd birthday), pitching a perfect ninth inning in getting his first batter to strike out, with a speed gun registering 101.4 mph. The next two batters were ground outs.

Matt Adams on DL, Grichuk recalled
The merry-go-round on yet another Cardinals' player injured and to the DL continues, this time it is first-baseman Matt Adams early on August 11, with a right shoulder inflammation. Some extra throwing work earlier in the week may have triggered the injury. It was not considered prudent to have Adams stay unplayable on the bench with four big games in Chicago on Aug. 11–14, against the division leading Cubs (71–41 .634), on a season-high nine-game winning streak. The Cardinals are 12 games behind (60–54 .526), going 4–6 on their last ten games, but tied with the Miami Marlins for the final Wild Card spot, with 48 games to go. Outfielder Randal Grichuk was recalled from AAA.

Matt Holliday fractures thumb, heads to DL
For the 11th time since July 1, another Cardinals' player is headed to the DL. Matt Holliday had his right thumb fractured from a HBP from Cubs' reliever Mike Montgomery in the 10th inning of their first game of the four-game series, August 11. It will also be the fifth Cardinals' player on the DL since the beginning of August. Four of the 10 who were on the DL have returned to the active roster.

Luke Weaver makes debut, Reyes first win, ends Cubs 11-game win streak
Luke Weaver made his debut in Chicago on August 13 ending their 11-game unbeaten streak in the month, pitching four innings, giving up just two runs on four hits (Double and two-run HR by Addison Russell), striking out three, and walking three. Alex Reyes gets his first major league win in relief, pitching three innings (fifth-seventh), giving up only one hit, while walking one and striking out three. Brandon Moss hit his 20th home run, a solo blast in the sixth, cutting the Chicago lead to 2–1. Jedd Gyorko hit his 17th home run in the seventh, a solo blast that tied the score. Two runs on a wild pitch and a bases-loaded walk gave the Birds a 4–2 lead. But the big blow was then a grand slam in the eighth inning by 25th birthday boy Randal Grichuk. It was only the second time a Cardinals' player has hit a grand slam on his birthday, with Colby Rasmus the first. It was the first slam by a Cardinals' player at Wrigley Field since Adam Kennedy in 2008. Grichuk has hit two home runs since his recall from AAA on August 11.

Seth Maness to DL, Sam Tuivailala recalled, Holliday to have surgery
For the 12th time since July 1, and sixth for August, a Cardinals' player is headed to the DL. Reliever Seth Maness on August 16 came aboard the DL train for the second time in 2016 (May 14 – June 19), missing 31 games. He will undergo season-ending Tommy John surgery on August 18, missing the remaining 44 games in 2016, and maybe all of the 2017 season. Reliever Sam Tuivailala was recalled. Matt Holliday will have surgery August 17 on his fractured right thumb. His prognosis for returning before the end of the season is unknown. After a medical review of his injury, Maness had surgery to fix his Ulnar collateral ligament of elbow joint instead of Tommy John surgery ligament replacement, drastically reducing his recovery time from 12 to 15 months to 6–8 months, which would make him available for Spring Training in 2017.

Luke Weaver gets first win
Rookie Luke Weaver got his first major league win (now 1–1), at home in the first of a three-game set against the Oakland Athletics, winning 3–1 on August 26. He celebrated his 23rd birthday on the 21st. Jedd Gyorko gave him all the runs he would need with a two-run home run in the first inning. Weaver became the sixth Cardinals' pitcher since 1913 to strike out seven in his home debut. He gave up just four hits (Double and a Home Run) and two walks in six innings. His ERA dropped to 3.60 and WHIP to 1.18 with 22 strikeouts, against 17 hits and five walks in his season total of 18.2 innings. Native St. Louisan and starter, lefty Ross Detwiler picked up the loss (now 1–3), going 5.1 innings. The A's haven't played in St. Louis since 2010.

Yadier Molina 10th highest in Cardinals games played
Yadier Molina played in his 1,580th game as a member of the St. Louis Cardinals on August 26, 10th all-time. He tied Rogers Hornsby and Ray Lankford on the list of most games played by a Cardinals' player.

Alex Reyes to make first MLB start
Alex Reyes, 21, will make his first MLB start at home on August 27, while Mike Leake recovers from a case of the shingles. He turns 22 on August 29. As a reliever, he has pitched  innings, has held opponents to five hits and no runs. He's struck out 13 and walked four. In 14 starts with Triple-A Memphis this season, Reyes went 2–3 with a 5.23 ERA and 1.454 WHIP. Though he averaged 12.5 strikeouts per nine innings, Reyes was often hampered by a lack of efficiency and lapses in command. Nevertheless, his repertoire—highlighted by a fastball that can reach triple digits, a curveball and changeup—makes him one of the franchise's most hyped prospects in years. Reyes ranked by MLB Pipeline as the Cardinals' No. 1 prospect and as the eighth-best prospect in baseball. Leake, who is 9–9 with a 4.56 ERA, had not previously missed a start this season.

As of August 27, with Carlos Martinez, 24 (born on Sep. 21), Alex Reyes, 21 (born on Aug. 29), and Luke Weaver, 23, (born on Aug. 21) all in the rotation, the Cardinals have three of the most exciting young starting pitching talents in baseball.

Reyes' start on August 27, at home against the Oakland Athletics showed his potential giving up only two hits (both singles), striking out four and giving up just one run, but also weak spots with lack of command a key factor in his giving up four walks and long innings. He pitched  innings, throwing 89 pitches. His fastball hit 100 mph, has an above-average curve, and mixed in 22 changeups which manager Mike Matheny described as "incredible." Another bright side was starting his major league career with 14 scoreless innings, snapped in that fifth inning. His ERA is now an impressive 0.64 over 14 innings in six games (1 Win, 1 Save), striking out 17, walking eight, giving up seven hits for a 1.07 WHIP. In the game, the team blew a 2–1 lead in the eighth inning, losing 2–3.

Cards only 30–37 (.448) at Home, 38–24 (.613) on Road
Through August 28, the team continues to struggle for wins at Home, compared to their No. 1 baseball ranking on the Road. The last time the Cardinals lost more Home games than the 37 presently, was in the non-playoff year, 2007. They averaged 52.5 Home wins during Mike Matheny's first four seasons. They would have to win 11 of their final 14 Home games to finish at Home over .500. Statistically, the biggest inconsistency between the team's home and road results has been on the offensive side. The Cardinals have averaged 5.58 runs per game and 1.58 homers per game away from Busch Stadium. At home, those averages are 4.4 and 1.28, respectively. The difference in home and road ERAs is negligible.

If there's a silver lining for the Cardinals, who hold a half-game lead for the NL's second Wild Card spot, it's this: 19 of their next 26 games will be on the Road, before their final seven games at Home. Only two NL teams have a worse Home record: the Atlanta Braves (19–44) with a 48–83 record, and the Arizona Diamondbacks (25–43) with a 55–76 record. The San Diego Padres are 30–34 with a 55–75 record, and the Philadelphia Phillies are 30–33 with a 60–70 record, for two bad teams that are better at Home. Their arch-rivals in the Central Division, the Chicago Cubs are a blistering 45–19 (.703) at Home, and an excellent 37–28 (569) on the Road, for an overall MLB best 82–47 (.636), leading the Cardinals by 14 games, with only 33 games remaining.

Mike Leake on DL, Kiekhefer recalled
For the 13th time since July 1, and the seventh in August (six in July), a player is placed on the DL. RHP and starter Mike Leake has a severe case of the shingles and wasn't healing fast enough. His DL on August 29, is retroactive to August 22. He is 9–9 with a 4.56 ERA in 25 starts, and eligible to return on Sept. 6. LHP reliever Dean Kiekhefer was recalled.

Cards can't get to 10 games over .500
For the entirety of a lackluster season, the Cardinals haven't been able to eclipse the 10 games over .500 mark. Prior to the August 31 game against the Brewers, the Cards had gone into five games this season with the chance to get to 10 games over .500 with a win. After the loss to the Brewers, they are now 0–6, while being outscored 15–40 in those games.

September

Matt Adams activated from DL
On September 2, Matt Adams was activated from the DL, after missing 18 games since August 10, from his right shoulder inflammation. He was hitting .248 with 12 home runs and 44 RBIs before his injury. He played five rehab games at AAA-Memphis, hitting .188 including 1 double and 1 home run. The rosters expanded on September 1, allowing the present 26 active players, while 14 remain inactive or on the DL.

Brayan Pena and Carson Kelly added to roster, Maness transferred to 60-day DL
On September 4, catcher Brayan Pena was activated from the 60-day DL, and AAA-Memphis rookie catcher Carson Kelly, 22, was purchased. Shortstop Dean Anna was designated for assignment to make room for Kelly on the 40-man roster. Seth Maness was transferred from the 15-day to the 60-day DL.

Carson Kelly makes his debut in Pittsburgh with hit
Newly called-up catcher Carson Kelly made his debut on September 5, against the Pittsburgh Pirates with a line-drive double in the eighth inning, and then scored his first run. He also was credited with his first assist as catcher in a 2–3 strikeout play.

Three final call-ups for September
Three final call-ups from the minors happened on September 6, when José Martínez (OF) making his major league debut, and two relievers who were here earlier, Mike Mayers, and Sam Tuivailala.

Cardinals tie NL record, 25 consecutive games with a HR
Yadier Molina's fourth career grand slam on September 6, gave the 2016 Cardinals an NL record tying 25 consecutive games with at least one home run, matching the San Diego Padres set earlier this year. The major league record is 27 games, set by the 2002 Texas Rangers. The grand slam was Molina's first since 2012.  It was the team's 197th home run for 2016, leading the NL. Their team record is 235 set in 2000.

Cardinals win in 9th inning, trailing with 2-outs
In yet another improbable comeback on September 6, the Cardinals won a critical game against the Pittsburgh Pirates, 9–6, with two outs and two strikes against Matt Carpenter in the ninth, trailing 5–6. He homered for the 18th time this season, tying the game at 6-all. Yadier Molina hit a double and then hot-hitting Randal Grichuk smashed his 22nd home run, giving them an 8–6 lead. Jhonny Peralta made it back-to-back with his seventh home run of the year, ending the five-home run night for the Redbirds and a 9–6 win after Seung Hwan Oh got his 16th save. Molina in the first inning hit a grand slam, seventh this year, with Matt Adams adding his 14th homer in the third inning for a 5–0 lead. The Pirates stormed back to take the lead after scoring one in the third, one in the fourth, and four in the fifth inning. Mike Mayers got his first major league win in relief with a scoreless eighth inning, keeping the team just one run behind. His debut on July 24 was one of the worst in MLB history, but this night he was perfect. Carpenter's home run was the first pinch-hit blast of his career, but the 15th by the team this season setting a new MLB record. The previous Major League high had been 14, set by the 2001 Arizona Diamondbacks and 2001 San Francisco Giants. Eight different Cardinals have contributed a pinch-hit homer this season.

Activation of Mike Leake from DL
Mike Leake, recovered from his two-week fight with shingles, was activated on September 7. He started against the Pirates, who were mired in an eight-game losing streak, longest for them since 2011.

Opposing baserunners running wild on pitchers
The Cardinals had allowed 69 steals against them through September 8, while they had stolen only 32. Yadier Molina is not at fault as much as the pitchers letting the runners get good jumps, instead of holding them closer to first base. Since his debut in 2004, the team has never allowed more than 64 steals until this year. Molina's pop time—defined as the time elapsed from the moment the pitch hits the catcher's mitt to the moment the intended fielder receives the throw—is the same as it was last year (1.92 seconds), when he allowed 37 stolen bases and ranked third in the National League with a caught-stealing percentage of 41. That pop time ranks seventh best among all catchers in 2016.

The dip in Molina's average arm strength on steal attempts—80.51 mph to 79.85 mph—isn't enough to alone explain the increase in attempts. There is great responsibility on the pitching staff. Mike Leake has allowed a career-high 13 steals for the most on the staff, while Jaime Garcia has allowed 11.

Cardinals lose for 38th time at home
Another home loss on September 8, gave the Cardinals 38 at home, most since their franchise 2007 season record. They had 30 wins for a  winning percentage, with 13 remaining home games. The 12–5 loss to the lowly Milwaukee Brewers dropped them out of the second Wild Card spot. A club that never had a dozen runs scored off it at home last year has now had it happen three times in 2016. Still seeking their first home series win since July, the Cardinals fell to 2–8 in the first game of a homestand with this loss. The last team to advance to postseason play with a losing home record was the 2001 Atlanta Braves.

Activation of Aledmys Diaz after missing 36 games
Shortstop Aledmys Diaz was activated before the game on September 11, after missing 36 games from a right thumb fracture suffered on July 31. Diaz was hitting .312/.376/.518 with 14 home runs, 25 doubles, 57 RBIs, and 64 runs scored in 96 games at the time of his injury.

Cardinals surpass 3 million attendance
For the 13th consecutive year starting in 2004, the team surpassed 3 million in home attendance on September 11.

Carson Kelly makes first start as catcher
Carson Kelly made his first start as catcher on September 11. Fellow rookie Luke Weaver was the starting pitcher. Both started the 2015 season at Class A Advanced Palm Beach. Kelly was taken in the second round in the 2012 draft. Weaver was the Cardinals' first-round pick (27th overall) in the 2014 Draft.

Michael Wacha activated
Former starter Michael Wacha was activated on September 14, and will be placed in the bullpen as a reliever for the remainder of the season.

Cardinals to open 2017 season against Cubs at Busch on April 3
The 2017 season opens for the Cardinals against the Cubs at home on April 3 (3:15 pm tentative) for a three=game set. An opening-series matchup between the Cubs and Cards in St. Louis hasn't happened since 2000. It will be the first time since 2011 that the Cardinals will open the season at home. The Cardinals' schedule is home-heavy early, with 50 of the team's 81 home games to be played before the All-Star break. St. Louis will end the year at home with series against division opponents Chicago (Sept. 25–28) and Milwaukee (Sept. 29-Oct. 1).

Trevor Rosenthal activated from DL, Reyes to starter, Garcia to bullpen
Former closer Trevor Rosenthal was activated from the DL before the September 15 game. Rosenthal went on the DL July 26, with a 5.13 ERA in 40 appearances. He boasted a strikeout rate of 13 per nine innings, but also had the worst walk rate (7.3) of his career. Alex Reyes was promoted from the bullpen to be a starter, replacing the declining and struggling starter Jaime Garcia. The decision by manager Matheny came two days after Garcia lasted a career-short  innings in his 29th start of the season. Garcia now shifts to the bullpen. His role will be an unfamiliar one, as Garcia hasn't pitched in relief since he was a rookie in 2008. This was not a planned move, but Garcia's 8.23 ERA over his last six starts necessitated a change by the Cardinals, who are locked in a tight Wild Card race with the Giants and Mets. Reyes has made a strong first impression since his Aug. 9 callup. Despite a walk rate of 5.1, he's posted a 1.29 ERA and struck out 34 over 28 innings. In his two previous spot starts, Reyes allowed three runs in  innings.

Cardinals eliminated from NL Central title
With their 70th loss in San Francisco (76 wins) on September 15, the Cardinals were officially eliminated from the NL Central title. They are 17 games behind the Cubs with 16 games to play. The Cubs having lost earlier, clinched with their previous 93 wins (53 losses ). It was the first NL Central title for them since 2008. The win moved the Giants one game in front of the New York Mets and two games ahead of the Cardinals in the National League Wild Card standings.

Wainwright sets DH-era RBI record
With four RBI against Colorado on September 20, Adam Wainwright increased his season total to 18, breaking the record for all pitchers in the designated hitter (DH) era – since 1973 – and the most since Ferguson Jenkins drove in 20 for the Cubs in 1971. He presently has 13 hits (7 Doubles, 1 Triple, 2 HRs) in 58 AB for a .224/.250/.483 line. For the modern Cardinals' record, Bob Gibson had 19 RBIs in 1970, with 33 hits (3 Doubles, 1 Triple, 2 HR) in 109 AB for a .303/.347/.404 line.

Cardinals' 40,000+ attendance game streak snapped
The Cardinals had a notable attendance streak snapped on September 26, as the club did not draw at least 40,000 at Busch Stadium for the first time since Sept. 24, 2013. The streak spanned 240 games. Monday's announced attendance was 34,942 in a miserable 2–15 loss, keeping them one game out of the second Wild Card spot with six games to play.

Cardinals activate Matt Holliday, refuse his $17 mil. 2017 option
Long-time Cardinals' outfielder since 2009, Matt Holliday was activated from the DL on September 30, with a present .242/.318/.450 line with 19 home runs and 60 RBIs. He was informed earlier in the week that the team would not pick up his 2017 option for $17 million, and would pay the contractual $1 million buyout.

He signed a $120 million seven-year extension deal after the 2009 season in the largest contract in Cardinals' history. He averaged 147 games played for the first five years, but injuries severely hurt his playing time in 2015 and this year. He posted five 20-homer seasons and four 90-RBI seasons. Holliday produced a cumulative WAR of 24.1 in those eight years. According to Fangraphs, which created a tool to convert WAR to dollars in order to estimate the value of a player, Holliday has been worth $168.6 million since 2010. He was active in the community with many charity appearances. He will turn 37 in mid-January 2017, after playing 13 major league seasons, the first five with the Colorado Rockies, and first half of 2009 with the Oakland Athletics until traded on July 24 to the Cardinals. After what could be his final at-bat with the Cardinals at home on September 30, against the Pittsburgh Pirates, he hit his first ever pinch-hit home run, his 20th of the season, giving him 61 RBIs for the season, in his 980th game with the Cardinals that included six 20-homer seasons. With his 20th home run, Holliday became the sixth Cardinals' player to reach that mark, tying the NL record held by the 1965 Milwaukee Braves, and later 2003 Atlanta Braves. The homer also extended the team's pinch-hit home run major league record, now 17.

He singled in a crucial second run in the 4–3 come-from-behind win over the Pirates, in his second consecutive pinch-hit appearance, October 1, giving him 62 RBIs for the season. His 2016 statistics now show for 109 games played in 382 at-bats: .246/.322/.461 with a .782 OPS, with 48 runs, 94 hits (including 20 doubles, 1 triple), 35 walks, 71 strikeouts, 8 hit-by-pitches, and 9 ground-into-double plays, with a 107 OPS+. For his eight years with the Cardinals, he hit .293/.380/.494 with an .874 OPS, and 138 OPS+ in 981 games and 3,581 at-bats. He gave a brief appearance in left field in the team's 162nd game, for 110 games in 2016, and 982 games as a Cardinals' player. The team has not completely ruled out a new contract in 2017 with him, although neither side expects it to happen.

Cardinals attendance
The attendance (38–43 ) was 3,444,490 down 2.2% from the 3,520,889 in 2015. Their attendance is second in the 15-team NL only to the Los Angeles Dodgers that has over four times the St. Louis metro population and a stadium that has a capacity of 56,000, over 13,000 more than Busch Stadium. Away, the club was 48–33, among the best in MLB. Scored 779 runs, giving up 712, +67. In 2015, scored 647, allowed 525, +122. Home record was the worst for the team since 1997, at 41–40. Before that, the 1990 Cardinals were 34–47.

Schedule and results

Regular Season Schedule (calendar style) 
Regular Season Schedule (sortable text) 
National Broadcast Schedule (all teams), EDT

Most games are broadcast on Fox Sports Midwest.

Game log

|- bgcolor=#ffbbbb
| 1 || April 3 || @ Pirates || 1–4 || Liriano (1–0) || Wainwright (0–1) || || 39,500 || 0–1 || 0–1
|- bgcolor=#ffbbbb
| 2 || April 5 || @ Pirates || 5–6 (11) || Lobstein (1–0)  || Maness (0–1)  || || 26,049 || 0–2 || 0–2
|- bgcolor=#ffbbbb
| 3 || April 6 || @ Pirates || 1–5 || Nicasio (1–0) || Leake (0–1) || Melancon (1) || 14,890 || 0–3 || 0–3
|- bgcolor=#ccffcc
| 4 || April 8 || @ Braves || 7–4 || Siegrist (1–0) || O'Flaherty (0–2) || Rosenthal (1) || 24,824 || 1–3 || 1–3
|-  bgcolor=#ccffcc
| 5 || April 9 || @ Braves || 12–2 || Martínez (1–0) || Teherán (0–1) || || 33,471 || 2–3 || 2–3 
|-  bgcolor=#ccffcc
| 6 || April 10 || @ Braves || 12–7  || Oh (1–0)  || Johnson (0–1) || Rosenthal (2) || 23,214 || 3–3 || 3–3 
|-  bgcolor=#ccffcc
| 7 || April 11 || Brewers || 10–1 || Wacha (1–0) || Jungmann (0–1) || || 47,608  || 4–3 || 4–3
|-  bgcolor=#ffbbbb
| 8 || April 13 || Brewers || 4–6 || Blazek (1–0)  || Rosenthal (0–1)  || Jeffress (4) || 40,994 || 4–4 || 4–4
|-  bgcolor=#ccffcc
| 9 || April 14 || Brewers || 7–0 || García (1–0) || Peralta (0–3) || || 40,168 || 5–4 || 5–4
|-  bgcolor=#ccffcc
| 10 || April 15 || Reds || 14–3 || Martínez (2–0) || Melville (0–1) || || 44,997 || 6–4 || 6–4 
|-  bgcolor=#ffbbbb
| 11 || April 16 || Reds || 8–9 || Finnegan (1–0) || Wainwright (0–2) || Hoover (1) || 44,425 || 6–5 || 6–4
|-  bgcolor=#ccffcc
| 12 || April 17 || Reds || 4–3 || Siegrist (2–0) || Ohlendorf (2–1) || Rosenthal (3) || 46,268 || 7–5 || 7–3
|-  bgcolor=#ffbbbb
| 13 || April 18 || Cubs || 0–5 || Lackey (3–0) || Leake (0–2) || – || 45,432 || 7–6 || 7–3
|-  bgcolor=#ffbbbb
| 14 || April 19 || Cubs || 1–2 || Hammel (2–0) || García (1–1) || Rondón (3) || 43,841 || 7–7 || 6–4
|-  bgcolor=#ccffcc
| 15 || April 20 || Cubs || 5–3 || Martínez (3–0)  || Hendricks (1–2) || Rosenthal (4) || 43,093 || 8–7 || 6–4
|-  bgcolor=#ffbbbb
| 16 || April 22 || @ Padres || 1–4 || Cashner (1–1) || Wainwright (0–3)  || Rodney (3) || 30,074  || 8–8 || 5–5
|-  bgcolor=#ccffcc
| 17 || April 23 || @ Padres || 11–2 || Wacha (2–0) || Quackenbush (1–1) || || 31,688 || 9–8 || 5–5 
|-  bgcolor=#ccffcc
| 18 || April 24 || @ Padres || 8–5 || Siegrist (3–0) || Maurer (0–1) || Rosenthal (5) || 37,395 || 10–8 || 6–4
|-  bgcolor=#ffbbbb
| 19 || April 25 || @ Diamondbacks || 7–12 || Greinke (2–2) || Bowman (0–1) || || 18,208 || 10–9 || 5–5
|-  bgcolor=#ccffcc
| 20 || April 26 || @ Diamondbacks || 8–2 || Martínez (4–0) || Miller (0–2) || || 19,074 || 11–9 || 5–5
|-  bgcolor=#ccffcc
| 21 || April 27 || @ Diamondbacks || 11–4 || Wainwright (1–3) || Corbin (1–3) || || 18,339 || 12–9 || 6–4
|-  bgcolor=#ffbbbb
| 22 || April 28 || @ Diamondbacks || 0–3 || De La Rosa (3–3) || Wacha (2–1) || Ziegler (5) || 18,933 || 12–10 || 5–5
|-  bgcolor=#ffbbbb
| 23 || April 29 || Nationals || 4–5  || Strasburg (4–0) || Leake (0–3) || Papelbon (8) || 45,246 || 12–11 || 5–5
|-  bgcolor=#ffbbbb
| 24 || April 30 || Nationals || 1–6 || Ross (3–0) || García (1–2) || || 42,723 || 12–12 || 5–5
|-

|-  bgcolor=ffbbbb
| 25 || May 1 || Nationals || 1–6 || Scherzer (3–1) || Martínez (4–1) || || 42,933 || 12–13 || 4–6
|-  bgcolor=ccffcc
| 26 || May 2 || Phillies || 10–3 || Wainwright (2–3) || Hellickson (2–2) || || 40,438 || 13–13 || 5–5
|-  bgcolor=ffbbbb
| 27 || May 3 || Phillies || 0–1 || Nola (2–2) || Wacha (2–2) || Gomez (9) || 40,087 || 13–14 || 4–6
|-  bgcolor=ccffcc
| 28 || May 4 || Phillies || 5–4 || Siegrist (4–0) || Gómez (2–1) || || 40,725  || 14–14 || 4–6
|-  bgcolor=ccffcc
| 29 || May 5 || Phillies || 4–0 || García (2–2) || Eickhoff (1–4) || || 41,818  || 15–14 || 5–5
|-  bgcolor=ffbbbb
| 30 || May 6 || Pirates || 2–4 || Liriano (3–1) || Martínez (4–2) || Melancon (8) || 43,093 || 15–15 || 4–6
|-  bgcolor=ccffcc
| 31 || May 7 || Pirates ||  6–4 || Rosenthal (1–1) || Schugel (0–1) || || 42,338 || 16–15 || 4–6
|-  bgcolor=ffbbbb
| 32 || May 8 || Pirates || 5–10 || Cole (3–3) || Wacha (2–3) || Melancon (9) || 42,441 || 16–16 || 4–6
|-  bgcolor=ccffcc
| 33 || May 10 || @ Angels || 8–1 || Leake (1–3) || Santiago (2–2) || || 30,679 || 17–16 || 5–5
|-  bgcolor=ccffcc
| 34 || May 11 || @ Angels || 5–2 || García (3–2) || Shoemaker (1–5) || Rosenthal (6) || 33,378 || 18–16 || 6–4
|-  bgcolor=ccffcc
| 35 || May 12 || @ Angels || 12–10 || Wainwright (3–3) || Weaver (3–2) || Siegrist (1) || 35,413 || 19–16 || 7–3
|-  bgcolor=ffbbbb
| 36 || May 13 || @ Dodgers || 4–8 || Stripling (1–2) || Wacha (2–4) || Jansen (12) || 46,716 || 19–17 || 6–4
|-  bgcolor=ffbbbb
| 37 || May 14 || @ Dodgers || 3–5 || Kazmir (3–3) || Martínez (4–3) || Jansen (13) || 48,459 || 19–18 || 6–4
|-  bgcolor=ccffcc
| 38 || May 15 || @ Dodgers || 5–2 || Leake (2–3) || Howell (1–1) || Rosenthal (7) || 51,350 || 20–18 || 6–4
|-  bgcolor=ffbbbb
| 39 || May 17 || Rockies || 1–3 || Bettis (4–2) || García (3–3) || McGee (13) || 41,109 || 20–19 || 5–5
|-  bgcolor=ccffcc
| 40 || May 18 || Rockies || 2–0 || Wainwright (4–3) || Rusin (1–2) || Rosenthal (8) || 42,618 || 21–19 || 6–4
|-  bgcolor=ccffcc
| 41 || May 19 || Rockies || 13–7 || Lyons (1–0) || Gray (1–2) || || 43,683 || 22–19 || 6–4
|-  bgcolor=ffbbbb
| 42 || May 20 || Diamondbacks || 7–11 || Corbin (2–3) || Martínez (4–4) || Barrett (1) || 43,301 || 22–20 || 6–4
|-  bgcolor=ccffcc
| 43 || May 21 || Diamondbacks || 6–2 || Leake (3–3) || Ray (2–3) ||  || 45,117 || 23–20 || 6–4
|-  bgcolor=ffbbbb
| 44 || May 22 || Diamondbacks || 2–7 || Greinke (5–3) || García (3–4) || || 43,829 || 23–21 || 5–5
|-  bgcolor=ccffcc
| 45 || May 23 || Cubs || 4–3 || Rosenthal (2–1) || Warren (3–1) || || 45,008 || 24–21 || 5–5
|-  bgcolor=ffbbbb
| 46 || May 24 || Cubs || 3–12 || Hammel (6–1) || Wacha (2–5) || || 44,588 || 24–22 || 5–5
|-  bgcolor=ffbbbb
| 47 || May 25 || Cubs || 8–9 || Arrieta (9–0) || Martinez (4–5) || Rondon (8) || 45,565 || 24–23 || 5–5
|-  bgcolor=ffbbbb
| 48 || May 26 || @ Nationals || 1–2 || Ross (4–4) || Leake (3–4) || Papelbon (13) || 26,176 || 24–24 || 4–6
|-  bgcolor=ccffcc
| 49 || May 27 || @ Nationals || 6–2 || García (4–4) || Scherzer (5–4) || || 30,781 || 25–24 || 5–5
|-  bgcolor=ccffcc
| 50 || May 28 || @ Nationals || 9–4 || Wainwright (5–3) || González (3–3) || || 38,274 || 26–24 || 5–5
|-  bgcolor=ffbbbb
| 51 || May 29 || @ Nationals || 2–10 || Strasburg (9–0) || Wacha (2–6) || || 38,898 || 26–25 || 4–6
|-  bgcolor=ccffcc
| 52 || May 30 || @ Brewers || 6–0 || Martínez (5–5) || Guerra (3–1) ||  || 34,569 || 27–25 || 5–5
|-  bgcolor=ccffcc
| 53 || May 31 || @ Brewers || 10–3 || Leake (4–4) || Peralta (3–6) || || 24,487 || 28–25 || 5–5
|-

|-  bgcolor=ffbbbb
| 54 || June 1 || @ Brewers || 1–3 || Davies (3–3) || García (4–5) || Jeffress (13) || 24,050 || 28–26 || 5–5
|-  bgcolor=ffbbbb
| 55 || June 3 || Giants || 1–5 || Cueto (9–1) || Wainwright (5–4) ||  || 43,560 || 28–27 || 4–6
|-  bgcolor=ccffcc
| 56 || June 4 || Giants || 7–4 || Lyons (2–0) || Samardzija (7–4) || Rosenthal (9) || 45,453 || 29–27 || 5–5
|-  bgcolor=ccffcc
| 57 || June 5 || Giants || 6–3 || Martínez (6–5) || Peavy (2–6) || Rosenthal (10) || 44,907 || 30–27 || 6–4
|-  bgcolor=ffbbbb
| 58 || June 7 || @ Reds || 6–7 || Cingrani (1–2) || Siegrist (4–1) ||  || 24,182 || 30–28 || 6–4
|-  bgcolor=ccffcc
| 59 || June 8 || @ Reds || 12–7 || Bowman (1–1) || Simon (2–6) ||  || 21,376 || 31–28 || 6–4
|-  bgcolor=ccffcc
| 60 || June 9 || @ Reds || 3–2 || Oh (2–0) || Ohlendorf (4–5) || Rosenthal (11) || 24,516 || 32–28 || 6–4
|-  bgcolor=ccffcc
| 61 || June 10 || @ Pirates || 9–3 (12) || Broxton (1–0) || Nicasio (5–5) || || 28,417 || 33–28 || 7–3
|-  bgcolor=ccffcc
| 62 || June 11 || @ Pirates || 5–1 || Martínez (7–5) || Liriano (4–6) || Rosenthal (12) || 36,962 || 34–28 || 7–3
|-  bgcolor=ccffcc
| 63 || June 12 || @ Pirates || 8–3 || Leake (5–4) || Niese (6–3) ||  || 31,148 || 35–28 || 7–3
|- bgcolor=ffbbbb
| 64 || June 14 || Astros || 2–5 || Fister (7–3) || García (4–6) || Harris (4) || 42,525 || 35–29 || 7–3
|-  bgcolor=ffbbbb
| 65 || June 15 || Astros || 1–4 || Sipp (1–2) || Siegrist (4–2) || Harris (5) || 42,008 || 35–30 || 7–3
|-  bgcolor=ffbbbb
| 66 || June 17 || Rangers || 0–1 || Hamels (7–1) || Wacha (2–7) || Dyson (12) || 44,064 || 35–31 || 6–4
|-  bgcolor=#ffbbbb
| 67 || June 18 || Rangers || 3–4 || Tolleson (1–2) || Rosenthal (2–2) || Diekman (2) || 44,375 || 35–32 || 5–5
|-  bgcolor=#ffbbbb
| 68 || June 19 || Rangers || 4–5 || Barnette (4–2) || Bowman (1–2) || Dyson (13) || 44,897 || 35–33 || 5–5
|-  bgcolor=ccffcc
| 69 || June 20 || @ Cubs || 3–2 || García (5–6) || Lackey (7–3) || Rosenthal (13) || 41,166 || 36–33 || 5–5
|-  bgcolor=ccffcc
| 70 || June 21 || @ Cubs || 4–3 || Wainwright (6–4) || Hammel (7–3) || Rosenthal (14) || 41,616 || 37–33 || 5–5
|-  bgcolor=ccffcc
| 71 || June 22 || @ Cubs || 7–2 || Wacha (3–7) || Arrieta (11–2) ||  || 41,058 || 38–33 || 5–5
|-  bgcolor=ffbbbb
| 72 || June 24 || @ Mariners || 3–4 || Roach (1–0) || Rosenthal (2–3)  || || 35,746 || 38–34 || 4–6
|-  bgcolor=ffbbbb
| 73 || June 25 || @ Mariners || 4–5 || Karns (6–2) || Leake (5–5) || Cishek (17) || 40,431 || 38–35 || 3–7
|-  bgcolor=ccffcc
| 74 || June 26 || @ Mariners || 11–6 || Siegrist (5–2) || Vincent (2–3) || || 35,955 || 39–35 || 4–6
|- bgcolor=ffbbbb
| 75 || June 27 || @ Royals || 2–6 || Duffy (3–1) || Wainwright (6–5) || || 31,355 || 39–36 || 4–6
|-  bgcolor=ccffcc
| 76 || June 28 || @ Royals || 8–4 || Wacha (4–7) || Ventura (6–5) || || 32,909 || 40–36 || 5–5
|-  bgcolor=ffbbbb
| 77 || June 29 || Royals || 2–3 (12) || Wang (5–0) || Maness (0–2) ||  || 44,840 || 40–37 || 5–5
|-  bgcolor=ffbbbb
| 78 || June 30 || Royals || 2–4 || Gee (3–2) || Leake (5–6) || Davis (19) || 44,802 || 40–38 || 5–5
|-

|-  bgcolor=ccffcc
| 79 || July 1 || Brewers || 7–1 || García (6–6) || Garza (1–1) || || 42,987 || 41–38 || 5–5
|-  bgcolor=ccffcc
| 80 || July 2 || Brewers || 3–0 || Wainwright (7–5) || Nelson (5–7) || Oh (1) || 40,573 || 42–38 || 5–5
|-  bgcolor=ccffcc
| 81 || July 3 || Brewers || 9–8 || Wacha (5–7) || Anderson (4–9) || Oh (2) || 41,148 || 43–38 || 5–5
|-  bgcolor=ffbbbb
| 82 || July 4 || Pirates || 2–4 || Niese (7–6) || Martínez (7–6) || Feliz (1) || 41,850 || 43–39 || 5–5
|-  bgcolor=ffbbbb
| 83 || July 5 || Pirates || 2–5 || Nicasio (7–6) || Leake (5–7) || Melancon (25) || 41,444 || 43–40 || 5–5
|-  bgcolor=ffbbbb
| 84 || July 6 || Pirates || 5–7 || Schugel (2–2) || Broxton (1–1) || Melancon (26) || 42,693 || 43–41 || 4–6
|-  bgcolor=ccffcc
| 85 || July 7 || Pirates || 5–1 || Wainwright (8–5) || Glasnow (0–1) || || 42,144 || 44–41 || 5–5
|-  bgcolor=ffbbbb
| 86 || July 8 || @ Brewers || 3–4 || Jeffress (2–2) || Rosenthal (2–4) || || 28,343 || 44–42 || 4–6 
|-  bgcolor=ccffcc
| 87 || July 9 || @ Brewers || 8–1 || Martínez (8–6) || Anderson (4–10) || || 37,101 || 45–42 || 5–5
|-  bgcolor=ccffcc
| 88 || July 10 || @ Brewers || 5–1 || Leake (6–7) || Guerra (6–2) || || 42,066 || 46–42 || 6–4
|- style="text-align:center; bgcolor="bbcaff"
| rowspan=3 |ASG || colspan=8 | 87th All-Star Game at Petco Park in San Diego, California, United States || rowspan=3 | Box   
|-  bgcolor="gold"   
| July 12 || colspan=2 | NL All-Stars 2, AL All-Stars 4 || Kluber (CLE) || Cueto (SFG) || Britton (BAL) || 42,386 || 43–42–2 
|- style="text-align:center; bgcolor="bbcaff"
| colspan=8 |Representing the Cardinals: Carpenter and Díaz
|-  bgcolor=ffbbbb
| 89 || July 15 || Marlins || 6–7 || Rodney (1–2) || Oh (2–1) || Ramos (28) || 42,034 || 46–43 || 5–5
|-  bgcolor=ccffcc
| 90 || July 16 || Marlins || 5–0 || Wainwright (9–5) || Koehler (6–8) || || 44,840 || 47–43 || 5–5
|-  bgcolor=ffbbbb
| 91 || July 17 || Marlins || 3–6 || Barraclough (5–2) || Broxton (1–2) || Ramos (29) || 43,046 || 47–44 || 4–6
|-  bgcolor=ccffcc
| 92 || July 18 || Padres || 10–2 || Leake (7–7) || Friedrich (4–6) ||  || 40,137 || 48–44 || 5–5
|- style="text-align:center; style="background-color:#bbb;"
| – || July 19 || Padres ||colspan="8" | Postponed (rain). Makeup date: July 20th. 
|-  bgcolor=ccffcc
| 93 || July 20 || Padres || 4–2 || Martínez (9–6) || Rea (5–4) || Oh (3) || 40,184 || 49–44 || 6–4
|-  bgcolor=ccffcc
| 94 || July 20 || Padres || 3–2 || García (7–6) || Clemens (1–1) || Oh (4) || 41,012 || 50–44 || 7–3
|-  bgcolor=ccffcc
| 95 || July 21 || Padres || 6–5 || Broxton (2–2) || Villanueva (1–1) || || 40,134 || 51–44 || 7–3
|-  bgcolor=ccffcc
| 96 || July 22 || Dodgers || 4–3 (16) || Maness (1–2) || Norris (5–9) || || 41,915 || 52–44 || 8–2
|-  bgcolor=ffbbbb
| 97 || July 23 || Dodgers || 2–7 || Maeda (9–7) || Leake (7–8) || || 45,477 || 52–45 || 7–3
|-  bgcolor=ffbbbb
| 98 || July 24 || Dodgers || 6–9 || Kazmir (9–3) || Mayers (0–1) || Jansen (29) || 41,423 || 52–46 || 6–4
|-  style="text-align:center; style="background-color:#bbb;"
| – || July 25 || @ Mets ||colspan="8" | Postponed (rain). Makeup date: July 26th.
|-  bgcolor=ccffcc
| 99 || July 26 || @ Mets ||  3–2 || Martínez (10–6) || Syndergaard (9–5) || Oh (5) || – || 53–46 || 7–3
|-  bgcolor=ffbbbb
| 100 || July 26 || @ Mets || 1–3 || Colón (9–5) || García (7–7) || Familia (36) || 37,116 || 53–47  || 6–4
|-  bgcolor=ccffcc
| 101 || July 27 || @ Mets || 5–4 || Broxton (3–2) || Familia (2–2) || Oh (6) || 37,851 || 54–47 || 7–3
|-  bgcolor=ccffcc
| 102 || July 28 || @ Marlins || 5–4 || Wacha (6–7) || Fernández (12–5) || Oh (7) || 25,060 || 55–47 || 7–3
|-  bgcolor=ccffcc
| 103 || July 29 || @ Marlins || 11–6 || Leake (8–8) || Ureña (1–3) || || 27,414 || 56–47 || 7–3
|-  bgcolor=ffbbbb
| 104 || July 30 || @ Marlins || 0–11 || Phelps (5–5) || García (7–8) || || 25,011 || 56–48 || 6–4
|-  bgcolor=ffbbbb
| 105 || July 31 || @ Marlins || 4–5 || Ramos (1–0) || Bowman (1–3) || || 23,666 || 56–49 || 5–5
|-

|-  bgcolor=ffbbbb
| 106 || August 2 || @ Reds || 5–7 || Díaz (1–1) || Oh (2–2) || || 25,270 || 56–50 || 4–6 
|-  bgcolor=ccffcc
| 107 || August 3 || @ Reds || 5–4 || Wacha (7–7) || Reed (0–6) || Oh (8) || 20,771 || 57–50 || 5–5
|-  bgcolor=ffbbbb
| 108 || August 4 || @ Reds || 0–7 || Finnegan (7–8) || Leake (8–9) || || 21,119 || 57–51 || 5–5
|-  bgcolor=ccffcc
| 109 || August 5 || Braves || 1–0 || García (8–8) || De La Cruz (0–4) || Oh (9) || 42,421 || 58–51 || 5–5 
|-  bgcolor=ffbbbb
| 110 || August 6 || Braves || 5–13 || Hernandez (1–0) || Martínez (10–7) || || 45,468 || 58–52 || 5–5
|-  bgcolor=ffbbbb
| 111 || August 7 || Braves || 3–6 || Foltynewicz (5–5) || Wainwright (9–6) || Johnson (8) || 42,960 || 58–53 || 4–6
|-  bgcolor=ccffcc
| 112 || August 8 || Reds || 5–4 || Maness (2–2) || Cingrani (2–4) || || 40,616 || 59–53 || 4–6
|-  bgcolor=ffbbbb
| 113 || August 9 || Reds || 4–7 || Lorenzen (2–0) || Bowman (1–4) || Iglesias (1) || 40,113 || 59–54 || 3–7 
|-  bgcolor=ccffcc
| 114 || August 10 || Reds || 3–2 || Garcia (9–8) || DeSclafani (6–1) || Oh (10) || 40,019 || 60–54 || 4–6
|-  bgcolor=ffbbbb
| 115 || August 11 || @ Cubs || 3–4 (11) || Montgomery (4–5) || Duke (2–1) || || 40,597 || 60–55 || 4–6
|-  bgcolor=ffbbbb
| 116 || August 12 || @ Cubs || 2–13 || Arrieta (14–5) || Wainwright (9–7) || || 40,848 || 60–56 || 4–6
|-  bgcolor=ccffcc
| 117 || August 13 || @ Cubs || 8–4 || Reyes (1–0) || Edwards Jr. (0–1) ||  || 41,278 || 61–56 || 4–6
|-  bgcolor=ccffcc
| 118 || August 14 || @ Cubs || 6–4 || Bowman (2–4) || Rondón (2–3) || Oh (11) || 41,019 || 62–56 || 5–5
|-  bgcolor=ccffcc
| 119 || August 16 || @ Astros || 8–5 || García (10–8) || Keuchel (7–12) || Oh (12) || 30,438 || 63–56 || 5–5
|-  bgcolor=ccffcc
| 120 || August 17 || @ Astros || 8–2 || Martínez (11–7) || Fister (11–8) || || 27,508 || 64–56 || 6–4
|-  bgcolor=ccffcc
| 121 || August 19 || @ Phillies || 4–3 (11) || Oh (3–2) || Herrmann (0–1) || Reyes (1) || 20,627 || 65–56 || 7–3
|-  bgcolor=ffbbbb
| 122 || August 20 || @ Phillies || 2–4 || Hellickson (10–7) || Weaver (0–1) || Gomez (33) || 32,288 || 65–57 || 6–4
|-  bgcolor=ccffcc
| 123 || August 21 || @ Phillies || 9–0 || Leake (9–9) || Velasquez (8–6) || || 20,127 || 66–57 || 7–3
|-  bgcolor=ffbbbb
| 124 || August 23 || Mets || 4–7 || Gsellman (1–0) || García (10–9) || Familia (42) || 40,082 || 66–58 || 6–4
|- bgcolor=ccffcc
| 125 || August 24 || Mets || 8–1 || Martínez (12–7) || deGrom (7–7) || || 40,053 || 67–58 || 7–3
|-  bgcolor=ffbbbb
| 126 || August 25 || Mets || 6–10 || Lugo (1–2) || Wainwright (9–8) || || 40,023 || 67–59 || 7–3
|-  bgcolor=ccffcc
| 127 || August 26 || Athletics || 3–1 || Weaver (1–1) || Detwiler (1–3) || Oh (13) || 40,221 || 68–59 || 7–3
|-  bgcolor=ffbbbb
| 128 || August 27 || Athletics || 2–3 || Coulombe (2–1) || Bowman (2–5) || Madson (26) || 41,607 || 68–60 || 6–4
|-  bgcolor=ffbbbb
| 129 || August 28 || Athletics || 4–7 || Triggs (1–1) || Garcia (10–10) || Madson (27) || 42,239 || 68–61 || 5–5
|-  bgcolor=ccffcc
| 130 || August 29 || @ Brewers || 6–5 || Socolovich (1–0) || Thornburg (5–5) || Oh (14) || 18,663 || 69–61 || 5–5
|-  bgcolor=ccffcc
| 131 || August 30 || @ Brewers || 2–1 (10) || Oh (4–2) || Knebel (0–2) || Duke (2) || 22,918 || 70–61 || 5–5
|-  bgcolor=ffbbbb
| 132 || August 31 || @ Brewers || 1–3 || Garza (5–6) || Weaver (1–2) || Thornburg (6) || 17,645 || 70–62 || 5–5
|-

|-  bgcolor=ffbbbb
| 133 || September 2 || @ Reds || 2–3 || Iglesias (2–1) || Oh (4–3) || || 21,441 || 70–63 || 4–6
|-  bgcolor=ffbbbb
| 134 || September 3 || @ Reds || 1–9 || Straily (11–7) || Garcia (10–11) || || 31,118 || 70–64 || 4–6
|-  bgcolor=ccffcc
| 135 || September 4 || @ Reds || 5–2 || Martinez (13–7) || Adleman (2–3) || Oh (15) || 26,985 || 71–64 || 4–6 
|-  bgcolor=ccffcc
| 136 || September 5 || @ Pirates || 12–6 || Wainwright (10–8) || Kuhl (3–3) || || 26,297 || 72–64 || 5–5
|-  bgcolor=ccffcc
| 137 || September 6 || @ Pirates || 9–7 || Mayers (1–1) || Watson (2–4) || Oh (16) || 20,369 || 73–64 || 5–5
|-  bgcolor=ffbbbb
| 138 || September 7 || @ Pirates || 3–4 || Williams (1–0) || Reyes (1–1) || Watson (11) || 21,523 || 73–65 || 5–5
|-  bgcolor=ffbbbb
| 139 || September 8 || Brewers || 5–12 || Guerra (8–3) || Garcia (10–12) || || 40,416 || 73–66 || 5–5
|-  bgcolor=ccffcc
| 140 || September 9 || Brewers || 4–3 || Martinez (14–7) || Nelson (7–14) || Oh (17) || 42,647 || 74–66 || 5–5
|-  bgcolor=ccffcc
| 141 || September 10 || Brewers || 5–1 || Wainwright (11–8) || Knebel (1–3)  || || 45,440 || 75–66 || 5–5
|-  bgcolor=ffbbbb
| 142 || September 11 || Brewers || 1–2 || Thornburg (6–5) || Siegrist (5–3) || || 44,703 || 75–67 || 5–5
|-  bgcolor=ffbbbb
| 143 || September 12 || Cubs || 1–4 || Hendricks (15–7) || Leake (9–10) || Chapman (34) || 43,397 || 75–68 || 5–5
|-  bgcolor=ccffcc
| 144 || September 13 || Cubs || 4–2 || Reyes (2–1) || Hammel (14–9) || Siegrist (2) || 44,060 || 76–68 || 6–4
|-  bgcolor=ffbbbb
| 145 || September 14 || Cubs || 0–7 || Lester (17–4) || Martinez (14–8) || || 44,701 || 76–69 || 5–5
|-  bgcolor=ffbbbb
| 146 || September 15 || @ Giants || 2–6 || Cueto (16–5) || Wainwright (11–9) || || 41,210 || 76–70 || 4–6
|-  bgcolor=ffbbbb
| 147 || September 16 || @ Giants || 2–8 || Moore (11–11) || Weaver (1–3) || || 41,278 || 76–71 || 3–7
|-  bgcolor=ccffcc
| 148 || September 17 || @ Giants || 3–2 || Oh (5–3) || Casilla (2–5) || || 41,403 || 77–71 || 4–6
|-  bgcolor=ccffcc
| 149 || September 18 || @ Giants || 3–0 || Reyes (3–1) || Suarez (3–4) || Oh (18) || 41,324 || 78–71 || 5–5
|-  bgcolor=ccffcc
| 150 || September 19 || @ Rockies || 5–3 || Martinez (15–8) || Anderson (5–6)  || Siegrist (3) || 26,783 || 79–71 || 5–5
|-  bgcolor=ccffcc
| 151 || September 20 || @ Rockies || 10–5 || Wainwright (12–9) || de la Rosa (8–9) || || 28,665 || 80–71 || 5–5
|- bgcolor=ffbbbb
| 152 || September 21 || @ Rockies || 1–11 || Marquez (1–0) || Weaver (1–4) || || 26,099 || 80–72 || 5–5
|-  bgcolor=ffbbbb
| 153 || September 23 || @ Cubs || 0–5 || Arrieta (18–7) || Leake (9–11) || || 40,791 || 80–73 || 5–5
|-  bgcolor=ccffcc
| 154 || September 24 || @ Cubs || 10–4 || Reyes (4–1) || Hammel (15–10) || || 40,785 || 81–73 || 5–5
|-  bgcolor=ffbbbb
| 155 || September 25 || @ Cubs || 1–3 || Lester (19–4) || Martinez (15–9) || Chapman (36) || 40,859 || 81–74 || 5–5
|-  bgcolor=ffbbbb
| 156 || September 26 || Reds || 2–15 || Adleman (3–4) || Garcia (10–13) || || 34,942 || 81–75 || 5–5
|-  bgcolor=ccffcc
| 157 || September 27 || Reds || 12–5 || Wainwright (13–9) || Stephenson (2–3) || || 34,286 || 82–75 || 6–4
|-  bgcolor=ffbbbb
| 158 || September 28 || Reds || 1–2 || DeSclafani (9–5) || Leake (9–12) || Iglesias (5) || 36,275 || 82–76 || 5–5
|-  bgcolor=ccffcc
| 159 || September 29 || Reds || 4–3 || Oh (6–3) || Wood (6–5) || || 38,830 || 83–76 || 5–5
|-  bgcolor=ccffcc
| 160 || September 30 || Pirates || 7–0 || Martinez (16–9) || Glasnow (0–2) || || 43,070 || 84–76 || 5–5
|-

|-  bgcolor=ccffcc
| 161 || October 1 || Pirates ||  4–3 || Siegrist (6–3) || Rivero (1–6) || Oh (19) || 43,328 || 85–76 || 5–5
|-  bgcolor=ccffcc
| 162 || October 2 || Pirates || 10–4 || Broxton (4–2) || Nicasio (10–7) || || 44,615 || 86–76 || 6–4
|-

|-
| Legend:       = Win       = Loss       = PostponementBold = Cardinals player

Roster

Injury report
Injury Report

Statistics

Batting statistics
(through October 3)

Pitching statistics

Records, awards, and milestones

Records

Awards
Major League Baseball All-Star Game selections

Other awards

Milestones

Executives and club officials
Source:
Executive officers
Chairman and chief executive officer:  William DeWitt, Jr.
 President:  William DeWitt III
 Senior vice president and general counsel: Mike Whittle
 Vice president of business development: Dan Good
Baseball operations department
 Senior vice president of baseball operations and general manager (GM):  John Mozeliak
 Assistant general manager:  Mike Girsch
 Special assistants to the GM: Ryan Franklin, Mike Jorgensen, Cal Eldred, Willie McGee, and Red Schoendienst
 Director of player development:  Gary LaRocque
 Director of player personnel: Matt Slater
 Director of Major League administration: Judy Carpenter-Barada
 Director of baseball administration:  John Vuch
 Baseball operations coordinator for player development: Tony Ferreira
 Director of scouting:  Randy Flores
 Director of international operations:  Moisés Rodríguez
 Assistant director of international scouting: Luís Morales
 Manager for baseball information:  Jeremy Cohen
 Baseball development analysts:  Matt Bayer, Kevin Seats, Dane Sorensen
 Baseball developers:  Pat Casanta, Brian Seyfert
 Additional coaching staff
 Senior medical advisor:  Barry Weinberg
 Head athletic trainer: Adam Olsen
 Strength/conditioning coach: Pete Prinzi
 Equipment manager: Rip Rowan
 Traveling secretary: C. J. Cherre
Communications department
 Vice president:  Ron Watermon 
 Director:  Brian Bartow
Cardinals Care and community relations department
 Vice president for community relations and executive director for Cardinals Care: Michael Hall
 Vice president for event services and merchandising:  Vicki Bryant
Finance and administration department
 Senior vice president and chief financial officer:  Brad Wood
Operations department
 Vice president:  Joe Abernathy
Ticket sales, marketing and corporate sales department
 Senior vice president of sales and marketing:  Dan Farrell

Minor league system and first-year player draft

Teams

Overview
After testing positive for marijuana, Major League Baseball suspended pitching prospect Alex Reyes on November 9, 2015, for 50 games including the remainder of his Arizona Fall League (AFL) play and start of the 2016 season. A total of eight players were selected from the Cardinals system in the rule 5 draft on December 10: Luis Perdomo (RHP to Colorado), Fernando Baez (RHP to Tampa Bay), Juan Caballero (RHP to Miami), Cory Jones (RHP to Baltimore), Mike O'Neill (OF to Cubs), Jhonny Polanco (RHP to Boston), Robelys Reyes (SS to Arizona) and Kender Villegas (RHP to Milwaukee).  The Cardinals selected Matthew Bowman, a right-handed pitcher, from the New York Mets.

Entering the 2016 season, MLB.com ranked Reyes as the tenth-best prospect in all the minor leagues, and Baseball Prospectus at number 13. The Cardnials sold Carlos Peguero's contract to the Tohoku Rakuten Golden Eagles of Nippon Professional Baseball (NPB) on July 8. In their updated prospect rankings, Baseball America placed Reyes second of all prospects in baseball in their July 8 update.  Also making the top 100 were Luke Weaver (75), Jack Flaherty (88), and Harrison Bader (89).

In 2016, the Cardinals signed three Cuban players as free agents: outfielders Randy Arozarena  ($1.25 million on July 27) and Jonatan Machado, and right-handed pitcher Johan Oviedo.

Awards

Major League Baseball draft

The draft was held on June 9–11, 2016, at Secaucus, New Jersey. Day one of the MLB Draft included the first 77 overall selections. The Cardinals, in addition to their trio of first-round picks, will also make the 70th overall selection that day. Because they posted MLB's best record in 2015, the Cardinals receive the last pick in each subsequent round. Rounds 3–10 will be held on June 10, followed by rounds 11–40 a day later. The Cardinals have not yet announced who they will send to Secaucus to serve as their on-site representative for the event's first day.

Because Heyward and Lackey both received qualifying offers and signed with the Chicago Cubs as free agents prior to the 2016 season, the Cardinals were allotted a total of three selections within the first 40 picks.

Former Cardinals' relief pitcher Randy Flores (2004–08) is in his first year as scouting director for any team, and is the fourth scouting director for the club since 2011. Instead of an analytical background as were his three predecessors, he brings a unique perspective as a former player.

The organization has been assigned a pool of $9.1433 million to use when signing players taken in the first 10 rounds. In addition, any bonus greater than $100,000 for a player taken after the 10th round will apply toward the bonus-pool total. Any team going up to 5 percent over its allotted pool will be taxed at a 75 percent rate on the overage. Overspending beyond 5 percent would cost the team future Draft picks, which the Cardinals are not expected to do. The signing deadline is July 15.

According to one MLB.com columnist, the Cardinals had the second-best draft of the 30 teams, with only the first-pick team in all rounds, Philadelphia Phillies, getting more raw talent and expected signable draftees.

With their 42 picks, the Cardinals drafted 16 RHP's, 10 outfielders, 4 LHP's, 3 SS's, 3 C's, 3 2B-men, 2 3B-men, and 1 1B-man.

Their first-round (compensatory A round) pick, Dylan Carlson rescinded his college commitment to California State University-Fullerton on June 14, and agreed to a signing bonus of $1.35 mil., which is $550,500 under the slot value for the 33rd draft pick.

Three more draft picks came to terms on June 16, including fifth-rounder Walker Robbins, who signed for $134,400 over the $315,600 slot value. Three undrafted free agents were also added.

The Cardinals signed their No. 1 draft pick, Delvin Perez, 17, on June 17, for the full slot value of $2,222,500. He is 6' 2", 180 lbs.

On June 18, the team announced the signing of their last remaining unsigned first-round pick, RHP Dakota Hudson. He signed for $2 mil., which was $122,000 over the slot value.

As of June 23, the Cardinals have signed 32 of their 42 draft picks including all of rounds one-to-10, with 10 unsigned.

With the signing of 2B-man J.R. Davis on July 2, the Cardinals have signed 33 draft picks, leaving nine unsigned.

2B-man Jonathan Murders signed on July 11, giving the team 34 signed of 42 draft picks, leaving eight unsigned.

List of Draft Selections

Free agents signed

References
Footnotes

Source notes

External links
2016 St. Louis Cardinals at Baseball Reference
St. Louis Cardinals official site 
2016 St. Louis Cardinals at ESPN

St. Louis Cardinals seasons
St. Louis Cardinals
St. Louis Cardinals